Pamillia is a genus of plant bugs in the family Miridae. There are about five described species in Pamillia.

Species
These five species belong to the genus Pamillia:
 Pamillia affinis Knight, 1925 i c g
 Pamillia behrensii Uhler, 1887 i c g b
 Pamillia nicaraguensis (Carvalho, 1992) c g
 Pamillia nyctalis Knight, 1925 i c
 Pamillia pilosella Knight, 1925 i c g
Data sources: i = ITIS, c = Catalogue of Life, g = GBIF, b = Bugguide.net

References

Further reading

 
 
 
 
 
 
 
 
 

Miridae genera
Ceratocapsini